Kirkhill Forest is a forest in Scotland, situated to the north-west of Aberdeen, on the north side of the A96 between the villages of Dyce and Blackburn. Kirkhill is a working forest with a network of paths for walking, a permanent orienteering trail, and a mountain bike fun park.

References

Forests and woodlands of Scotland